The Wyoming House of Representatives is the lower house of the Wyoming State Legislature. There are 62 Representatives in the House, representing an equal number of single-member constituent districts across the state, each with a population of at least 9,000. The House convenes at the Wyoming State Capitol in Cheyenne.

Members of the House serve two year terms without term limits. Term limits were declared unconstitutional by the Wyoming Supreme Court in 2004, overturning a decade-old law that had restricted Representatives to six terms (twelve years).

The current Speaker of the House is Albert Sommers.

Composition of the House of Representatives

Leadership

Members of the Wyoming House of Representatives

Past composition of the House of Representatives

See also
Wyoming State Capitol
Wyoming State Legislature
Wyoming State Senate

References

External links
Wyoming House of Representatives
Project Vote Smart - State House of Wyoming

State lower houses in the United States
Cheyenne, Wyoming
Wyoming Legislature